The 1895–96 season was the fourth in the history of the Western Football League, and the first to be held under this name. The league had been known as the Bristol & District League until this season.

Warmley were the Division One champions for the third time in four years. Barton Hill won Division Two but were not promoted.

League constitution and rules
The twelve teams that would take part in Division One were agreed at a meeting of the league on Wednesday 8 May 1895. The top eight finishers from the previous season (Hereford Thistle, St George, Warmley, Staple Hill, Gloucester, Eastville Rovers, Trowbridge Town and Clifton) were all automatically granted a place in the division for the 1895–96 campaign, while the bottom four finishers (Bedminster, Mangotsfield, Swindon Wanderers and Clevedon) would all need to apply for re-election to retain a spot in the top flight. Clevedon opted not to return to the league this season, but Barton Hill, Cardiff and St Paul's all submitted applications to the league. The result of the election is shown in the table below.

A change to the way teams were ranked in the league table was agreed at a committee meeting in September 1895. Up to this point when teams finished level on points goal average was used as a tie-breaker, but for this season the use of goal average was abolished and any teams tied on points would play a test match at the end of the season to decide their ranking.

Division One
Two new clubs joined Division One for this season, though the number of clubs remained at 12 after Hereford Thistle and Clevedon left.
Cardiff
St Paul's, promoted from Division Two

Test match 
Since Eastville Rovers and Staple Hill were tied on points at the end of the season a one-off test match was arranged between the two teams to decide which team would finish second and which finished third. The match ended in a 2–2 draw, leading to the two teams being declared joint runners-up.

Division Two
Four new teams joined Division Two this season, though the number of clubs remained at 11 after Mangotsfield Reserves, Waverley and Willsbridge left the league and St Paul's were elected to Division One. Willsbridge's withdrawal was due to them having no ground available on which to play their home games.
Cumberland
Eastville Wanderers
Fishponds
Frenchay

References

1895-96
1895–96 in English association football leagues